
Gmina Gorzkowice is a rural gmina (administrative district) in Piotrków County, Łódź Voivodeship, in central Poland.

The current Mayor is Alojzy Włodarczyk. The Deputy Mayor is Robert Kukulski.

History 

The earliest traces of settlement in the Gorzkowice commune date back to nearly 3000 years ago, while the earliest mention comes from the Middle Ages, when the Archbishop Janisław gave the local parish church the tithes from the surrounding villages. In 1414, the number of people in the village was estimated at 720.

Villages
Gmina Gorzkowice contains the villages and settlements of Białek, Borzęcin, Bujnice, Bujnice ZR, Bujniczki, Bukowina, Cieszanowice, Czerno, Daniszewice, Góry Rdułtowskie, Gorzędów-Kolonia, Gorzkowice, Gorzkowiczki, Gościnna, Grabostów, Grabowiec, Jadwinów, Józefina, Kamienny Most, Kolonia Bujnice, Kolonia Kotków, Kolonia Krzemieniewice, Kolonia Plucice, Kolonia Żuchowice, Komorniki, Kopanina, Kotków, Krosno, Krosno-Biadów, Krosno-Bugaj, Krosno-Dąbrowy, Krosno-Huby, Krosno-Ludwików, Krzemieniewice, Marianek, Pieńki Gorzkowskie, Pieńki Stolarskie, Plucice, Poręba Sobaków, Porosło, Rdułtowice, Rogów, Ryszardów, Sobaków, Sobakówek, Sosnowiec, Szczepanowice, Szczukocice, Wilkoszewice, Wola Kotkowska and Żuchowice.

Neighbouring gminas
Gmina Gorzkowice is bordered by the gminas of Gomunice, Kamieńsk, Kodrąb, Łęki Szlacheckie, Masłowice and Rozprza.

References

 Polish official population figures 2006

Gorzkowice
Piotrków County